The Mental Health (Scotland) Act 1984 was an act covering Scotland, comparable to the Mental Health Act 1983 which covered England and Wales. It was supoerceded by the Mental Health (Care and Treatment) (Scotland) Act 2003.

References

Mental health in Scotland